Papirio Picedi (1528–1614) was a Roman Catholic prelate who served as Bishop of Parma (1606–1614)
and Bishop of Borgo San Donnino (1603–1606).

Biography
Papirio Picedi was born in Arcola di Lunigiana, Italy and ordained a priest in 1596.
On 8 Jan 1603, he was appointed during the papacy of Pope Clement VIII as Bishop of Borgo San Donnino.
On 19 Jan 1603, he was consecrated bishop by Paolo Emilio Zacchia, Cardinal-Priest of San Marcello al Corso, with Claudio Rangoni, Bishop of Piacenza, and Juan Esteban Ferrero, Bishop of Vercelli, with serving as co-consecrators. 
On 30 Aug 1606, he was appointed during the papacy of Pope Paul V as Bishop of Parma.
He served as Bishop of Parma until his death on 4 Mar 1614.

References

External links and additional sources
 (for Chronology of Bishops) 
 (for Chronology of Bishops) 
 (for Chronology of Bishops) 
 (for Chronology of Bishops) 

17th-century Italian Roman Catholic bishops
Bishops appointed by Pope Clement VIII
Bishops appointed by Pope Paul V
1528 births
1614 deaths